Dieter Mann (20 June 1941 – 3 February 2022) was a German actor, director, university professor, and radio personality. In his career he acted in several theater productions and in over 140 film and television productions. Between 1984 and 1991 he was director of the Deutsches Theater. In 1986, he became a member of the Berlin Academy of Arts. Internationally, he is best known for having portrayed Wilhelm Keitel in Downfall.

Early life
Mann was born in Berlin as the son of a worker. He had an older brother who later became a foreign correspondent. He went to school in Pankow and learned the trade of lathe operator at VEB Kühlautomat. After his Abitur, he began acting training in the early 1960s at the Ernst Busch Academy of Dramatic Arts.

Career

From 1964 to 2006, during his time at the Deutsches Theater Berlin, Mann portrayed the Templar in Gotthold Ephraim Lessing's Nathan the Wise, the lead role in Clavigo and Edgar Wibeau in Die neuen Leiden des jungen W.. He also portrayed Demetrius in a German production of A Midsummer Night's Dream. From 1984 to 1991, he was Intendant of the house. 

Mann was also a radio announcer for Rundfunk der DDR and would often read plays while on the air. His audio books became bestsellers.

After the reunification of Germany, Mann appeared in a number of productions on film and television. He had guest appearances on the television series such as AS – Danger is his business, Peter Strohm, Tresko, Ein starkes Team, Stubbe – Von Fall zu Fall, In aller Freundschaft, Rosa Roth, Bella Block and several times in Tatort. From 1998 to 2007, he played Prof. Dr. Siegmar Bondzio in the series Der letzte Zeuge. Mann played at the Burgtheater in Vienna and at Frank Castorf's Volksbühne.

From 1995, Mann was a lecturer at the Ernst Busch Academy of Dramatic Arts.

Mann played the role of Generalfeldmarschall Wilhelm Keitel in the Academy Award-nominated 2004 film Downfall. His final roles were in the 2011 drama Vergiss dein Ende as Gunther and in the 2014 television comedy film Die letzten Millionen as Günter.

Awards
Source:

 1965 Erich Weinert Medal
 1975 Art Prize of the German Democratic Republic
 1981 Johannes R. Becher Gold Medal
 1984 National Prize 2nd class
 1986 Member of the Academy of Arts Berlin
 1997 Critics' Award from the Berliner Zeitung for his title role in Ithaca
 2003 nomination of the Berliner Morgenpost for the Critics' Prize 2003 for Fülle des Wohllauts
 2004 honorary member of the Deutsches Theater
 Member of the Deutsche Akademie der Darstellenden Künste

Personal life
His mother-in-law was actress Inge Keller. Mann remarried and lived near Königs Wusterhausen, Germany.

In 2016, Mann announced that he had Parkinson's disease. He died on 3 February 2022 in Berlin, at the age of 80.

Filmography 
The following is an incomplete list of the films where he is credited as actor

1965: Berlin um die Ecke – Olaf
1967: Geschichten jener Nacht – Robert Wagner (segment "Die Prüfung")
1968: I Was Nineteen – Willi Lommer
1969: Unterwegs zu Lenin – Erich
1969: Wie heiratet man einen König? – Götz
1970: He, Du! – Bernd
1973: Der kleine Kommandeur – Oberleutnant Schulz
1974: Leben mit Uwe – Dr. Hunger
1974: Der nackte Mann auf dem Sportplatz – Bauarbeiter
1975: Lotte in Weimar – Karl, the butler
1976: Requiem für Hans Grundig
1976: Die Leiden des jungen Werthers – von Steinfeld
1978: Brandstellen – Bruno Kappel
1978: Ich will euch sehen – SD-Offizier
1978: Das Versteck – Lutz Bibow
1980:  – Karl Erp
1980: Levins Mühle – Regierunsgrat von Tittlack
1983: Mat Mariya
1983: Moritz in der Litfaßsäule – Vater Zack
1986: Drost
1987: Stielke, Heinz, fünfzehn… – Untersturmführer
1989: Zwei schräge Vögel – Dr. Bauer
1992: Wunderjahre – Chefredakteur
1993: Kaspar Hauser – Baron Wedel
1995: The Promise (Das Versprechen) – Konrad's Father
1996: Life Is a Bluff – Regierungsdirektor Funkel
1997:  – Horst Herold
2001: Goebbels und Geduldig
2004: Blindgänger – Mann in Zivil
2004: Die Stunde der Offiziere – General Carl-Heinrich von Stülpnagel
2004: Downfall (Der Untergang) – Feldmarschall Wilhelm Keitel
2009: 13 Semester – Professor Schäfer
2013: Vergiss dein Ende – Günther

Writings

References

External links

1941 births
2022 deaths
20th-century German male actors
21st-century German male actors
Deaths from Parkinson's disease
Ernst Busch Academy of Dramatic Arts alumni
German male film actors
German male television actors
Male actors from Berlin
Members of the Academy of Arts, Berlin
Neurological disease deaths in Germany
Recipients of the Art Prize of the German Democratic Republic